The phrase four-letter word refers to a set of English-language words written with four letters which are considered profane, including common popular or slang terms for excretory functions, sexual activity and genitalia, blasphemies, terms relating to Hell or damnation when used outside of religious contexts, or slurs. The "four-letter" claim refers to the fact that many (but not all) English "swear words" are incidentally four-character monosyllables. The term was used in this sense as early as 1886 in the United States and Great Britain.

History

Common four-letter words (in this sense) that are widely considered vulgar or offensive to a notable degree include: cunt, fuck (and regional variants such as feck, fick, fock and foak), jism (or gism), jizz, shit, slut, twat and tits. Piss (formerly an offensive swear word) in particular, however, may be used in non-excretory contexts (pissed off, i.e. "angry", in US English and British UK English; pissed, i.e. "drunk" in UK English) that are often not considered particularly offensive, and the word also occurs several times with its excretory meaning in the King James Bible. Several of these have been declared legally indecent under the United States Federal Communications Commission (FCC) TV and radio open-airwave broadcasting regulations.

A number of additional words of this length are upsetting to some, for religious or personal sensitivity reasons, such as: arse (UK), damn, crap, hell, piss, wang, and wank (UK). Racist, ableist, and slurs pertaining to an individual's sexual orientation may also qualify, such as mong (in the UK not a racial slur, but short for Mongol, or someone with Down syndrome – previously called Mongolism), gook,  kike, spic, coon, dago and dyke.

Several "four-letter words" have multiple meanings (some even serving as given names), and usually only offend when used in their vulgar senses, for example:
cock,
dick,
knob,
muff,
puss,
shag (UK) and
toss (UK).
A borderline category includes words that are euphemistic evasions of "stronger" words, as well as those that happen to be short and have both an expletive sound to some listeners as well as a sexual or excretory meaning (many also have other, non-vulgar meanings):
butt (US),
crud,
darn,
dump,
heck,
poop (US),
slag (UK, NZ, AUS),
slut and
turd, as several examples.
Finally, certain four-lettered terms with limited usage can be considered offensive by some, within the regional dialect in which they are used, such as
mong and
mary.

Occasionally the phrase "four-letter word" is humorously used to describe common words composed of four letters. Typical examples include the word work, implying that work can be unpleasant, or the game of golf, jokingly referred to as a four-letter word when a player's pastime becomes an exercise in frustration. Charlotte Observer journalist Doug Robarchek noted in 1993 how many politicians have names with four letters, "Ever notice how many U.S. politicians have names that are also four-letter words? Ford, Dole, Duke, Bush, Gore ... and how many make us think of four-letter words?"

Similar euphemisms in other languages 
 Chinese: The term 三字經 (lit. Three Character Classic) is used to describe swearing, as many such phrases in Chinese consist of three characters.
 Dutch: A similar tradition occurs with "three-letter words", e.g. kut ("cunt"/"twat"), pik and lul ("cock"/"dick"/"prick").
 Finnish: Rude words tend to be five-letter words, like the common swear word perse meaning "arse", or paska meaning "shit". Other offensive five-letter words refer to the genital region, eg. kulli and kyrpä ("cock"/"dick"/"prick"), along with pillu and vittu ("twat"/"cunt"). 
 French: the word merde ("shit") is sometimes referred to as le mot de cinq lettres ("the five-letter word"), or le mot de Cambronne. Also, profanities in French are usually called gros mots (coarse words).
 German: the phrase Setz dich auf deine vier Buchstaben! ("sit down on your four letters") is mainly used speaking to children, as it refers to the word Popo, meaning "rump" in baby talk. A variant, Setz dich auf deine fünf Buchstaben! ("sit down on your five letters"), alludes to the vulgar use of the word Arsch, meaning "arse" (UK) or "ass" (US).
 Latin: a common insult used to be Es vir trium litterarum, meaning "you are a man of three letters". The underlying implication was that the addressed was a fur, meaning "thief", although if challenged, the speaker could always claim he simply meant vir, that is, "man".
 Polish: the word dupa ("arse"/"ass") is called cztery litery ("the four letters"). Historically, also kiep, which formerly used to be a taboo word meaning "female genitals", but presently is a mild or humorous insult meaning "a fool" or a modern slang term for a cigarette. There is also a phrase Siadaj na cztery litery (sit down on your four letter), meaning sit on your arse.
 Russian: the word хуй ("cock"/"dick"/"prick"), the most common obscenity, is called  "the three-letter word" (russ.: "слово из трёх букв") or just "three letters" (russ.: "три буквы") and is one of the key words of the "Russian mat".

In popular culture
Generic references, not specifying the word:
 Cole Porter's 1934 song "Anything Goes" includes the line "Good authors too who once knew better words, now only use four-letter words writing prose. Anything goes."
 Elton John's I've Seen That Movie Too from his 1973 album Goodbye Yellow Brick Road contains the phrase in the chorus. 
 Cheap Trick's 1982 album One on One finishes with a song titled "Four Letter Word".
 The Cardigans in their song "For What It's Worth", use the "four-letter word" expression several times.
 That Four-Letter Word is a 2006 independent film from India.
 Welsh punk band Four Letter Word, formed in 1991, named themselves after the phrase.
 A Four Letter Word is also the title of a 2007 gay-themed movie starring Jesse Archer and Charlie David.
 "Four Letter Word" is also the title of a 2003 song by Def Leppard.
 American punk-rock band Gossip released a track entitled "Four Letter Word" on their 2009 album Music For Men.
 The 2007 Cold in California album by Ingram Hill includes a track entitled "Four Letter Word".
 The opening track of Beady Eye's 2011 album Different Gear, Still Speeding is entitled "Four Letter Word".
 Echobelly on their album On (Echobelly album) included a song named: "Four Letter Word".
 Chocolate Starfish have a track called "Four Letter Word" on their eponymous album.
 The song "Irresistible" by Fall Out Boy features the line "You know I give my love a four-letter name".
 In the 2019 BBC-HBO mini-series Years and Years written by Russell T Davies, after controversialist businesswoman Vivienne Rook gains popularity by claiming that she "doesn't give a fuck" about the Israeli-Palestinian conflict whilst on Question Time and subsequently railing against being censored, she establishes the populist, far-right Four Star Party, whose symbol is four asterisks.
A specified word that actually has four letters:
Love:
 The fact that love is a word with four letters has been used in several popular song titles, including "Love Is Just a Four-Letter Word" written by Bob Dylan and performed by Joan Baez, "Four Letter Word" written by Ricki and Marty Wilde and performed by Kim Wilde, "4 Letter Word" written by Claude Kelly and Matt Squire and performed by David Cook.
 A television show called Love Is a Four Letter Word was produced by ABC in Australia.
 Jack Ingram's song "Love You", uses love as a play on another four-letter word: "Yeah, I'm sick an' lovin' tired of all your lovin' around".
 Metallica uses the line "Love is a four-letter word" in the song "The Day That Never Comes" from their album Death Magnetic.
 R&B singer Raheem DeVaughan used the "love" meaning in his song "Four Letter Word" on his 2008 album Love Behind The Melody.
 Love Is a Four Letter Word, 2012, Jason Mraz
 The song "How We Do ('93 Til)" by Freddie Gibbs features the line "love is a four-letter word like fuck and shit, so, love, you can suck my dick".
Work:
 In a song sung by Cilla Black and covered by The Smiths, "Work Is a Four-letter Word", this phrase is used to describe work as obscene.
 Work Is a Four-Letter Word is the title of a 1968 British comedy film.
Hope:
 The song "Counting Stars" by OneRepublic features the line "hope is our four-letter word".
Hate:
 The band Shock Therapy sang a song "Hate Is a 4-Letter Word".
Jazz:
 A photo-montage by partner-artists Privat & Primat is titled "Jazz and Love are 4-Letter Words".
Nice:
 Good Omens's famous wall scene: Crowley's "I'm not nice; nice is a four-letter word"
A specified word that does not actually have four letters:
 The band Cake made a play on words in their song "Friend Is a Four Letter Word."
 The song "Baby, I'm an Anarchist" by Against Me! features the line "to you solidarity's a four-letter word."
 In Degrassi: The Next Generation Episode 504, Mr. Simpson (Snake) says "...in my life, spontaneous is a four-letter word."
 In the song "Absolute zero" by "Stone Sour", there is a line that goes as follows: "Man is a four-letter word, it's really absurd"

See also

 Seven dirty words
 Tetragrammaton

References

English words
Euphemisms
Profanity